Events in the year 1661 in Norway.

Incumbents
Monarch: Frederick III

Events
7 August - The Sovereignty Act was signed by the estates of the realm, turning Norway into an absolute monarchy.
September - Iver Krabbe is appointed Steward of Norway.
The construction of Munkholmen fort is finished.

Arts and literature

Architecture
Construction of the Rosendal Manor started.

Births
11 May – Niels Knagenhielm, civil servant, land owner and non-fiction writer (d. 1737).

Deaths
27 January – Axel Mowat, admiral and land owner (born 1592).

Full date unknown
Lauritz Galtung, admiral and land owner (b.c 1615).

See also

References